Olivella puelcha is a species of small sea snail, marine gastropod mollusk in the subfamily Olivellinae, in the family Olividae, the olives.  Species in the genus Olivella are commonly called dwarf olives..

Description

Distribution
This species occurs in the Atlantic Ocean from Brazil to Argentina.

References

External links
 
 Orbigny, A. D. d'. (1834-1847). Voyage dans l'Amérique méridionale (le Brésil, la république orientale de l'Uruguay, la République argentine, la Patagonie, la république du Chili, la république de Bolivia, la république du Pérou), exécuté pendant les années 1826, 1827, 1828, 1829, 1830, 1831, 1832 et 1833. Tome 5(3) Mollusques. pp. i-xliii, 1-758, 85 plates
 Pastorino G. (2009). The genus Olivella Swainson, 1831 (Gastropoda: Olividae) in Argentine waters. The Nautilus. 123(3): 189-201

puelcha
Gastropods described in 1835